While a variety of theories have been postulated for the name of Canada, its origin is now accepted as coming from the St. Lawrence Iroquoian word , meaning 'village' or 'settlement'. In 1535, indigenous inhabitants of the present-day Quebec City region used the word to direct French explorer Jacques Cartier to the village of Stadacona. Cartier later used the word Canada to refer not only to that particular village but to the entire area subject to Donnacona (the chief at Stadacona); by 1545, European books and maps had begun referring to this small region along the Saint Lawrence River as Canada.

From the 16th to the early 18th century, Canada referred to the part of New France that lay along the Saint Lawrence River. In 1791, the area became two British colonies called Upper Canada and Lower Canada. These two colonies were collectively named the Canadas until their union as the British Province of Canada in 1841.

Upon Confederation in 1867, Canada was adopted as the legal name for the new country at the London Conference, and the word Dominion was conferred as the country's title. By the 1950s, the term Dominion of Canada was no longer used by the United Kingdom, which considered Canada a "Realm of the Commonwealth". The government of Louis St. Laurent ended the practice of using Dominion in the statutes of Canada in 1951.

The Canada Act 1982, which brought the constitution of Canada fully under Canadian control, referred only to Canada. Later that year, the name of the national holiday was changed from Dominion Day to Canada Day. The term Dominion was used to distinguish the federal government from the provinces, though after the Second World War the term federal had replaced dominion.

Etymology

The name Canada is now generally accepted as originating from the St. Lawrence Iroquoian word , meaning 'village' or 'settlement'. Related translations include 'land' or 'town', with subsequent terminologies meaning 'cluster of dwellings' or 'collection of huts'. This explanation is historically documented in Jacques Cartier's Bref récit et succincte narration de la navigation faite en MDXXXV et MDXXXVI.

Although the Laurentian language, which was spoken by the inhabitants of St. Lawrence Valley settlements such as Stadacona (modern-day Quebec City) and Hochelaga (modern-day Montreal) in the 16th century, is now extinct, it was closely related to other dialects of the Iroquoian languages, such as the Oneida and Mohawk languages. Prior to archeological confirmation that the St. Lawrence Iroquois were a separate people from the Mohawk, most sources specifically linked the name's origin to the Mohawk word instead of the Laurentian one.

A widespread perception in Canadian folklore is that Cartier misunderstood the term "Canada" as the existing proper name of the Iroquois people's entire territory rather than the generic class noun for a town or village. For instance, the Historica Canada's Heritage Minute episode devoted to Cartier's landing at Hochelaga is scripted as having Cartier believe that "Kanata" or "Canada" was the established name of the entire country. This is not supported by Cartier's own writings, however—in Bref récit, Cartier fully understands the actual meaning of the word ("They call a town Canada"), and his earliest name for the wider territory is "" ('country of Canadas', 'land of Canadas', or 'land of villages').

While the Saint-Lawrence Iroquoian origin for the name Canada is now widely accepted, other theories have been put forth in the past.

Iberian origin theory
An alternative explanation favoured by philologist Marshall Elliott linked the name to the Spanish word cañada, meaning 'glen' or 'valley'.

The earliest iterations of the Spanish "nothing here" theory stated that the explorers made the declaration upon visiting the Bay of Chaleur, while later versions left out any identifying geographic detail.

The known Portuguese presence in modern Canadian territory, meanwhile, was located in Newfoundland and Labrador. Neither region is located anywhere near Iroquoian territory, and the name Canada does not appear on any Spanish or Portuguese maps of the North American coast that predate Cartier's visit.

In most versions of the Iberian origin theory, the Spanish or Portuguese passed their name on to the Iroquois, who rapidly adopted it in place of their own prior word for a village; however, no historical evidence for any such Iberian-Iroquoian interaction has ever actually been found. Elliott's "valley" theory, conversely, was that the Spanish gave their name for the area directly to Jacques Cartier, who then entirely ignored or passed over the virtually identical Iroquoian word. Notably, Cartier never wrote of having any awareness of any preexisting Spanish or Portuguese name for the region either, meaning that Elliott's allegation that the  derivation was not adequately supported by Cartier's own writing on the matter was also true of his own preferred theory.

These words do not actually exist in Spanish, however.

Minor or humorous theories
British philologist B. Davies surmised that by the same process which initially saw the First Nations mislabelled as Indians, the country came to be named for the Carnata region of India or that region's Kannada ethnic group; however, this theory has attracted no significant support from other academics.

Additional theories have attributed the name "Canada" to: a word in an unspecified indigenous language for 'mouth of the country' in reference to the Gulf of St. Lawrence; a Cree word for 'neat or clean'; a claimed Innu war cry of "kan-na-dun, Kunatun"; a shared Cree and Innu word, p'konata, which purportedly meant 'without a plan' or 'I don't know'; a short-lived French colony purportedly established by a settler whose surname was Cane; Jacques Cartier's description elsewhere in his writings of Labrador as "the land God gave to Cain;" or, to a claim that the early French habitants demanded a "can a day" of spruce beer from the local intendant (a claim easily debunked by the facts that the habitants would have been speaking French, not English, and that canning did not exist until the 19th century).

In their 1983 book The Anglo Guide to Survival in Québec, humourists Josh Freed and Jon Kalina tied the Iberian origin theory to the phrase nada mas caca ('nothing but shit'). No historian or linguist has ever analyzed this explanation as anything more than an obvious joke.

Canadian
The demonym "Canadien" or "Canadian" once referred exclusively to the indigenous groups who were native to the territory. Its use was extended over time to the French settlers of New France, and later the English settlers of Upper Canada.

Colonial usage

New France
European explorer Jacques Cartier transcribed the Saint-Lawrence Iroquoian word (pronounced ) as "Canada" and was the first European to use the word to refer not only to the village of Stadacona but also to the neighbouring region and to the Saint Lawrence River, which he called rivière de Canada during his second voyage in 1535. By the mid 1500s, European books and maps began referring to this region as Canada.

Canada soon after became the name of a colony in New France that stretched along the St. Lawrence River. The terms "Canada" and "New France" were often used interchangeably during the colonial period.

British North America

After the British conquest of New France (including ceding of the French colony, Canada) in 1763, the colony was renamed the Province of Quebec. Following the American Revolution and the influx of United Empire Loyalists into Quebec, the colony was split on 26 December 1791 into Upper and Lower Canada, sometime being collectively known as "The Canadas", the first time that the name "Canada" was used officially in the British regime.

Some reports from the 1840s suggest that in that era, the word "Canada" was commonly pronounced "Kaugh-na-daugh" rather than its more contemporary pronunciation.

Upper and Lower Canada were merged into one colony, the Province of Canada, in 1841, based on the recommendations of the Durham Report. The former colonies were then known as Canada East and Canada West, and a single legislature was established with equal representation from each. Underpopulated Canada West opposed demands by Canada East for representation by population, but the roles reversed as Canada West's population surpassed the east's. The single colony remained governed in this way until 1 July 1867, often with coalition governments. A new capital city was being built at Ottawa, chosen in 1857 by Queen Victoria, and became a national capital.

Selection of the name Canada

At the conferences held in London to determine the form of confederation that would unite the Province of Canada (now Ontario and Quebec), the Province of New Brunswick, and the Province of Nova Scotia, a delegate from either Nova Scotia or New Brunswick proposed the name Canada in February 1867, and it was unanimously accepted by the other delegates. There appears to have been little discussion, though other names were suggested.

Other proposed names
While the provinces' delegates spent little time, if any, in settling on Canada as the name for the new country, others proposed a variety of other names:

 Anglia – the medieval Latin name for England
 Albionoria – 'Albion of the north'
 Borealia – from borealis, the Latin word for 'northern'; compare with Australia
 Cabotia – in honour of Italian explorer John Cabot, who explored the eastern coast of Canada for England
 Colonia
 Efisga – an acronym of English, French, Irish, Scottish, German, Aboriginal 
 Hochelaga – an old name for Montreal
 Laurentia
 Mesopelagia – 'land between the seas'
 New Albion
 Norland
 Superior
 Tupona – acronym for The United Provinces of North America
 Transatlantica
 Ursalia – 'place of bears'
 Vesperia – 'land of the evening star'
 Victorialand – in honour of Queen Victoria

Walter Bagehot of The Economist newspaper in London argued that the new nation should be called Northland or Anglia instead of Canada. On these names, the statesman Thomas D'Arcy McGee commented, "Now I would ask any honourable member of the House how he would feel if he woke up some fine morning and found himself, instead of a Canadian, a Tuponian or a Hochelegander?".

Kingdom and Dominion
Working towards the Confederation of Canada, Canada's founders deliberated on the official title for their new country, primarily between the "Kingdom of Canada" or the "Dominion of Canada."

In J. S. Ewart's two volume work, The Kingdom Papers, it is noted that the following names were considered for the union of British North America: "The United Colony of Canada", "the United Provinces of Canada", and "the Federated Provinces of Canada". Ewart was also an ardent advocate for the formation of "the Republic of Canada", a position which was rarely expressed in those times.

Kingdom of Canada

During the Charlottetown Conference of 1864, John A. Macdonald, who later became the first Prime Minister of Canada, talked of "founding a great British monarchy," in connection with the British Empire. He advocated, in the fourth Canadian draft of the British North America Act, the name "Kingdom of Canada," in the text is said:

{{quote|
The word 'Parliament' shall mean the Legislature or Parliament of the Kingdom of Canada.
The word 'Kingdom' shall mean and comprehend the United Provinces of Ontario, Quebec, Nova Scotia, and New Brunswick.
The words 'Privy Council' shall mean such persons as may from time to time be appointed, by the Governor General, and sworn to aid and advise in the Government of the Kingdom.}}

Canada's founders, led by Macdonald, wished their new nation to be called the Kingdom of Canada in order to "fix the monarchical basis of the constitution." The governor general at the time, The 4th Viscount Monck, supported the move to designate Canada a kingdom; however, officials at the Colonial Office in London opposed this potentially "premature" and "pretentious" reference for a new country. They were also wary of antagonizing the United States, which had emerged from its Civil War as a formidable military power with unsettled grievances because British interests had sold ships to the Confederacy despite a blockade, and thus opposed the use of terms such as kingdom or empire to describe the new country.

 Adoption of Dominion 

Sir Samuel Leonard Tilley, Premier of New Brunswick, suggested the term Dominion, inspired by Psalm 72:8 (from the King James Bible): "He shall have dominion also from sea to sea, and from the river unto the ends of the earth." This is also echoed in Canada's motto: A Mari Usque Ad Mare (Latin for 'from sea to sea').

The term Dominion had been used for centuries to refer to the lands held by a monarch, and had previously been adopted as titles for the Dominion of New England and the Dominion and Colony of Virginia. It continued to apply as a generic term for the major colonial possessions of the British Empire until well into the 20th century; although Tilley and the other Fathers of Confederation broadened the meaning of the word dominion to a "virtual synonym for sovereign state." Its adoption as a title for Canada in 1867 served the purpose of upholding the monarchist principle in Canada; in a letter to Queen Victoria, Lord Carnarvon stated:The North American delegates are anxious that the United Provinces should be designated as the 'Dominion of Canada.' It is a new title, but intended on their part as a tribute to the Monarchical principle which they earnestly desire to uphold.Macdonald, however, bemoaned its adoption. In a letter to Lord Knutsford on the topic of the loss of the use of the word kingdom, Macdonald said:

He added as a postscript that it was adopted on the suggestion of British colonial ministers to avoid offending republican sensibilities in the United States:

Use of the term dominion was formalized in 1867 through Canadian Confederation. In the Constitution of Canada, namely the Constitution Act, 1867 (British North America Acts), the preamble of the Act indicates:

Moreover, section 2 indicates that the provinces:

French terms
The French translation of the 1867 British North America Act translated "One Dominion under the Name of Canada" as "" using Puissance ('power') as a translation for dominion. Later, the English loanword dominion was also used in French.

The Fathers of Confederation met at the Quebec Conference of 1864 to discuss the terms of this new union. One issue on the agenda was to determine the Union's "feudal rank" (see Resolution 71 of the Quebec Conference, 1864).

Use of Dominion
There are numerous references in United Kingdom Acts of Parliament to "the Dominion of Canada;" and the British North America Act, 1867 (BNA Act) referred to the formation of "one Dominion under the name of Canada." Section 4 of the BNA Act also declares that: "Unless it is otherwise expressed or implied, the Name Canada shall be taken to mean Canada as constituted under this Act;" this has been interpreted to mean that the title of the country is simply Canada. Nonetheless, the term "Dominion of Canada" appears in the Constitution Act, 1871—the usage of which was "sanctioned"—and both "Canada" and "Dominion of Canada" appear in other texts of the period, as well as on numerous Canadian banknotes before 1935.

Until the 1950s, the term Dominion of Canada was commonly used to identify the country. As the country acquired political authority and autonomy from the United Kingdom, the federal government began using simply Canada on state documents. Quebec nationalist leaders also objected to dominion, arguing that it suggested Ottawa would have control over Quebec.

Under Prime Minister Louis St-Laurent, compromises were reached that quietly, and without legislation, "Dominion" would be retired in official names and statements, usually replaced by "federal". The St. Laurent government thereby ended the practice of using "Dominion" in the Statutes of Canada in 1951.

The independence of the separate Commonwealth realms was emphasised after the accession of Queen Elizabeth II in 1952, when she was proclaimed not just as Queen of the United Kingdom, but also Queen of Canada, Queen of Australia, Queen of New Zealand, Queen of South Africa, and of all her other "realms and territories". This also reflected the change from dominion to realm; in the proclamation of Queen Elizabeth II's new titles in 1953, the phrase "of her other Realms and Territories" replaced "dominion" with another mediaeval French word with the same connotation, "realm" (from royaume). 

With that said, the national holiday of "Dominion Day" kept that name until May 1980, when a private member's bill to replace the name with Canada Day was unexpectedly passed in the House. In the Senate, Eugene Forsey and the Monarchist League of Canada strongly defended the traditional usage. When a Gallup poll showed 70% of all Canadians favoured the change, the Senate approved the bill without a recorded vote.

The Canada Act 1982 refers only to Canada and does not use the term dominion. No constitutional statute amends this name, nor does any Canadian legal document state that the name of the country is anything other than Canada. Moreover, official sources of the United Nations system,
international organizations (such as the Organization of American States), the European Union,
the United States, and other polities with which Canada has official relations as a state either consistently use Canada as the only official name, affirm that Canada has no long-form name, or affirm that the formal name is simply Canada.

The terms Dominion and Dominion of Canada are still considered to be appropriate, although arcane, titles for the country. The federal government continues to produce publications and educational materials that specify the currency of these titles, although these publications are not themselves legal or official documents.Forsey, Eugene A.  2005.  How Canadians Govern Themselves  (PDF), 6th ed.  Canada: Ottawa; pp. 8-9. The preface to the publication specifies that the opinions reflected are those of the author, and "do not necessarily reflect those of parliament."
For instance, in 2008 the Canadian government registered the Maple Leaf Tartan, designed in 1964, with the Scottish Tartans Authority. The tartan's alternate name is "Dominion of Canada."

The term Dominion and Dominion of Canada is also used in a colonial historical sense, having been used to distinguish contemporary (post-1867) Canada from either the earlier Province of Canada or from the even earlier The Canadas and modern history of the current realms. The terms have also been used to distinguish the federal government from the provinces, though in this usage, "federal" has replaced "dominion". For example, The Canadian Almanac stopped using Dominion of Canada in 1964.

See also

List of Canadian place names of royal heritage
Canadian provincial and territorial name etymologies
Origins of names of cities in Canada
List of Canadian place names of Ukrainian origin
List of Canadian place names of Indigenous origin
List of Canadian place names of English origin
List of Canadian place names of Scottish origin
List of Canadian place names of Spanish origin

 Notes 

References

Bibliography
 
 
 
 
 
 
 
 

Further reading

 Choudry, Sujit. 2001(?). "Constitution Acts" (based on looseleaf by Hogg, Peter W.). Constitutional Keywords''. University of Alberta, Centre for Constitutional Studies: Edmonton.

External links
 Dominion of Canada FAQ
 Origin of the Name - Canada - Canadian Heritage

Legal history of Canada
Canada
Canada
Canada